The Oakland Motor Car Company of Pontiac, Michigan, was an American automobile manufacturer and division of General Motors. Purchased by General Motors in 1909, the company continued to produce modestly priced automobiles until 1931 when the brand was dropped in favor of the division's Pontiac make.

Beginning
The company was created by Edward Murphy who owned the Pontiac Buggy Company and Alanson Brush who was working as a consultant in Detroit after leaving the Cadillac Motor Company. Oakland Motor Company was named for Oakland County, Michigan, in which it was based. As originally conceived and introduced, the first Oakland used a design created by Brush and presented to Murphy who liked the idea and decided to go into business. The vertical two-cylinder engine that rotated counterclockwise was originally presented to Cadillac but was rejected. This design by Alanson Partridge Brush, inventor of the single-cylinder Cadillac and Brush Runabout, also featured a planetary transmission. The 1908 Oakland came in five body styles, designated Model A–E , varing from a runabout to a landaulet. The first year of Oakland production, 1908, had 278 vehicles roll off the line.

GM Division
After one year of production, Oakland's principal founder, Edward Murphy, sold half of the company to William C. Durant's General Motors Corporation in early 1909. When Murphy died in the summer of 1909, GM acquired the remaining rights to Oakland. Within General Motors, Oakland was later slotted as their entry-level brand below the more expensive Oldsmobile, Buick, and Cadillac  cars. Conventional four-cylinder engined models were introduced shortly after the GM takeover, and GM didn't acquire the volume-priced Chevrolet until 1917, and Oakland found itself competing with the Ford Model T introduced in October 1908. Once GM assumed operations of Oakland, production was moved to the factory that manufactured Cartercar in Pontiac, Michigan, another Durant acquisition that was cancelled while the resources were newly utilized, and the Oakland Model 40 was introduced. Starting with 1910 Oakland was exclusively offering 4-cylinder flathead engines with five different wheelbases and their advertising slogan was "The Car with a Conscience". By early 1920, however, production and quality control problems began to plague the division. In 1921, under new General Manager Fred Hannum, a consistent production schedule was underway and the quality of the cars improved, and Oakland vehicles shared the GM A platform used by Chevrolet. One marketing tactic was the employment of a quick-drying bright blue automotive lacquer by Duco (a DuPont brand product), leading to the slogan "True Blue Oakland Six". The Oakland was built only in Pontiac, Michigan, which is the county seat of Oakland County. The name antedates any GM association with an automobile manufacturing facility  in Oakland, California, that built Chevrolet vehicles before Chevrolet joined GM called Oakland Assembly.

Oakland Six and V8
In 1913 the Oakland Six was introduced followed in 1916 by the Model 50  flathead V8 engine sourced from Northway Motor and Manufacturing company, and production soared to 35,000 in 1917. The Series 50 V8 used a flathead design shared with the Oldsmobile Light Eight and the Cadillac Type 51. The Model 50 was only available from 1915-1917 as a seven-passenger touring sedan on a 127" wheelbase and was listed at US$1,600 ($ in  dollars ). 

In 1930, Oakland reintroduced the Model 101 V8, again using a flathead architecture, on a 117" wheelbase and offered it as a roadster, phaeton, coupe, closed body sedan and sport coupe. Prices were listed at US$895 ($ in  dollars ) for the roadster or phaeton to US$1,045 ($ in  dollars ) for the Custom Sedan. The Oakland V8 was shared with the Viking V8 which was a companion of Oldsmobile and was the only product sold. 1931 was the last year for the Oakland Model 301 V8 and the only vehicle available was the V8 with very few changes, and was renamed the 1932 Pontiac Series 302 V8. The 1932 V8 had an oversquare bore and stroke of  x  displacing  with a compression ratio of 5.2:1. Horsepower was rated at 85 @3200 RPM using three main bearings, solid valve lifters and a Marvel one barrel carburetor. Unusually, Pontiac switched to the straight-eight for 1933 until it was replaced in 1954.

Pontiac joins Oakland then replaces Oakland
As General Motors entered the 1920s, the product ladder started with the price-leading Chevrolet marque, and then progressed upward in price, power, and luxury to Oakland, Oldsmobile, Buick, and ultimately Cadillac. By the mid-1920s, a sizable price gap existed between Chevrolet and Oakland, as well as a wide gap between Oldsmobile and Buick. Also, a product gap existed between Buick and Cadillac. General Motors pioneered the idea that consumers would aspire to buy up an automotive product ladder if a company met certain price points-called the Companion Make Program. To address this, General Motors authorized the introduction of four brands priced and designed to fill the gaps. Cadillac would introduce the LaSalle to fill the gap between Cadillac and Buick. Buick would introduce the Marquette to handle the upper end of the gap between Buick and Oldsmobile. Oldsmobile would introduce the Viking, which took care of the lower end of the same gap.

Oakland's part in this plan was the 1926 Pontiac, a shorter-wheelbase "light six" priced to sell at a four-cylinder car's price point, but still above Chevrolet. Pontiac was the first of the companion marques introduced, and in its first year sold 49,875 units. By 1929, GM sold 163,000 more Pontiacs than Oaklands. The discontinuation of Oakland was announced with the onset of the Great Depression in 1931. Pontiac was the only companion make to survive beyond 1940, or to survive its "parent" make.

References

External links

 Pontiac-Oakland Club International
 Oakland Company Factory photograph, 1907
 Oakland Automobiles 1920 1931

Motor vehicle manufacturers based in Michigan
Defunct motor vehicle manufacturers of the United States
1900s cars
1910s cars
1920s cars
Vehicle manufacturing companies established in 1907
Vehicle manufacturing companies disestablished in 1931
General Motors marques
Pontiac
Defunct brands
1907 establishments in Michigan
1931 disestablishments in Michigan
Defunct manufacturing companies based in Michigan
Brass Era vehicles
Vintage vehicles
1930s cars
Pre-war vehicles
Cars introduced in 1907